Leslie Merrill Behunin, Jr. (July 16, 1936 – December 5, 2021), known professionally as Buddy Merrill, was an American guitar player and steel guitar player, best known as a regular on The Lawrence Welk Show.

Early life
Leslie Merrill Behunin, Jr. was the oldest of four children, born to Leslie Merrill Behunin, Sr. and Juanita Marie Ortego Behunin, in Torrey, Utah. Nicknamed "Buddy", at age eight he got his first guitar and soon began performing live with his father's band, The Fremont River Rangers. Three years later, he appeared with his father live on local television station KDYL in Salt Lake City. When the family moved to Los Angeles, California in the early 1950s, he continued to perfect his musical skills, playing both the acoustic guitar and the steel guitar. He also began to do home recordings of himself playing rhythm guitar to a song.

The Lawrence Welk Show
Buddy Merrill joined The Lawrence Welk Show in 1955, the same year it first went national on ABC.  On the Welk Show, he performed his guitar version of "Blue Suede Shoes," a popular hit by Elvis Presley in 1956.  (Retrieved from "The Lawrence Show."  PBS TV.  May 12, 2018)   He briefly left the show from 1959 to 1962 when he was drafted by the Army. On his return to the Music Makers he was joined in the band's rhythm section with fellow guitarist Neil Levang.  For the next twelve years the two would perform together on television. Merrill used a Fender Stratocaster guitar for many of his TV appearances, and in 1959 was featured in a print advertisement for the instrument.

Life after Welk
In 1974, Merrill left the Welk orchestra to devote more time to writing music and recording for Accent Records. He continued to perform live, either as a solo artist or with a band, until 1988 when he retired from the road. He continued to perform as a studio musician. He penned a symphonic work, "Living Sea", as well as original compositions for tape programmers and television commercials. He latterly lived in Shingle Springs, California, with his friend and band mate, Brandy Lane.

He died on December 5, 2021, at the age of 85.

Discography
 Classics in Rhythm, Accent ACD 5054, 2001
 Classic Guitars, Accent ACD 6042, 2001
 Guitars Express, ACD 6041, 1998
 The Exciting Guitars of Buddy Merrill, ACD 5038, 1998
 World of Guitars, ACD 6030, 1994 (sampler of Buddy's compositions)
 Beyond the Reef, ACD 5034, 1992
 Classics in Rhythm, ACS 5054, 1980
 Guitar Sounds of Buddy Merrill, ACS 50100, 1977
 Buddy Merrill Today, ACS 5052, 1975
 Upbeat M.O.R., ACS 5048, 1975
 World of Guitars, ACS 5042, 1972
 Country Capers, ACS 5040, 1972
 25 Great All-Time Hits, ACS 5038, 1971
 Steel Guitar Country,ACS 5036, 1970
 Beyond the Reef,ACS 5034, 1970
 Guitar Sounds of the 70's, ACS 5032, 1970
 The Best of Buddy Merrill, ACS 5034, 1969
 Electrosonic Guitars, ACS 5028, 1969
 Land of a Thousand Guitars, ACS 5026, 1967
 Sounds of Love, ACS 5024, 1967
 The Many Splendored Guitars of Buddy Merrill, ACS 5022, 1967
 Guitars on Fire, Accent SQBO 91997
 The Exciting World of Buddy Merrill, ACS 5020, 1966
 Latin Festival, ACS 5018, 1966
 Holiday from Guitars, Accent AC 5016, 1965
 The Guitar Sounds of Buddy Merrill, ACS 5010, 1965
 Songs of the Islands (with Lawrence Welk), Dot DLP 3251, 1960 (re-issued by Ranwood R 8022 and R 2007)

References

External links
Biography, SpaceAgePop.com; accessed December 4, 2014.
Profile, welkmusicalfamily.com; accessed December 4, 2014.
Interview with Buddy Merrill for the NAMM(National Association of Music Merchants) Oral History Program February 15, 2011
Flea market Funk: Buddy Merrill – Funky
 
 

1936 births
2021 deaths
Guitarists from Utah
People from Wayne County, Utah
People from Greater Los Angeles
Lawrence Welk
20th-century American guitarists
Guitarists from Los Angeles
American male guitarists